Ginsburgsmilus is an extinct genus of carnivorous mammal of the family Barbourofelidae that was endemic to Africa during the early Miocene. There is only one known specimen of Ginsburgsmilus napakensis, dated to 20-19 mya.

Taxonomy
Ginsburgsmilus was named by Morales et al. (2001). It was assigned to Barbourofelidae by Morlo et al. (2004) and Morlo (2006).

In 2001, a team led by Jorge Morales described Ginsburgsmilus as a new genus in the family Barbourofelidae; the fossil material had been previously identified as Afrosmilus turkanae.

References

Miocene carnivorans
Miocene mammals of Africa
Barbourofelidae
Prehistoric carnivoran genera